This page describes the grammar of Maithili language, which has a complex verbal system, nominal declension with a few inflections, and extensive use of honoroficity. It is an Indo-Aryan language native to the Maithili people and is spoken in the Indian state of Bihar with some speakers in Jharkhand and nearby states.The language has a large number of speakers in Nepal too, which is second in number of speakers after Bihar.

Maithili has the following characteristic morphological features:

Number is not grammatically marked.
Gender distinctions are also absent in verbs and pronouns. 
There is a lexical distinction of gender in the third person pronoun.
Transitive verbs are distinguished from intransitive.

Nominals
Nouns are inflected for several cases. Grammarians consider only few of them to be pure inflection.

*These forms are abundant in literature, but are less used in spoken language.

‡Ergative is more used in eastern and southern dialects. Maithili also has parallel accusative structure and both can be used. If ergative is used, then nominative is used as absolutive.
**Used only in neuter and inanimates.
§It is used, when a postposition is added to the word. Some other postpositions are-
 

Some postpositions are added to the genitive too.

Inflectional plural is less in use than the Periphrastic one, and is mostly found in literature.
Periphrastic Plural is made सभsuffixes like सभऺ səbʰᵊ; लोकनि loːknɪ̆, सबहि səbəɦɪ̆, गण ɡəɳ, जन dʑən could be used for animates and आरनि aːrənɪ̆, सनि sənɪ for all.

Common vowel stem

Consonant stem

Feminine stem -आ aː

 *Though, used for neuter and inanimates, it is used for female inanimates or abstract.
†Used for tatsama words (words borrowed from Sanskrit).

Other Vowel stems

 Specifically saying, inanimates.
Sanskrit vocative, could be used or not.

Adjectives
The difference between adjectives and nouns is very minute in Maithili. However, there are marked adjectives there in Maithili.

Pronouns
Pronouns in Maithili are declined in similar way to nominals. However, genetic case has a different form in most of the pronouns.

First and Second Person Pronouns

Third Person Pronouns

Verbs
Conjugation of a transitive verb "कह" /kəɦ/ 'to tell'.

References

Maithili language
Indo-Aryan grammars